Metro Music is the debut album by Canadian new wave band Martha and the Muffins. It was released in 1980 on Dindisc, the first album release for the label, and contains the international hit single "Echo Beach".

The cover image design by Peter Saville is a map of Toronto, the band's hometown, and is based on a map from the National Topographic System of Canada.

The entire Metro Music album also formed the first part of Martha and the Muffins' 1987 compilation Far Away in Time.

Release
The album's first single, "Echo Beach", became a hit in several countries, reaching number three in Canada, number one in Portugal, number five in Australia and number 10 in the United Kingdom in March 1980. It also reached number 37 in the United States on the Club Play Singles chart.  "Saigon" was released as a follow-up single in the UK a few months later, but failed to chart. In Canada, the follow-up single was "Paint by Number Heart" — it climbed to number 69. The album itself was certified gold in Canada (50,000 units) on September 1, 1980; "Echo Beach" was certified gold there (5,000 units) on the following October 1.

Track listing

Personnel
Martha Johnson – keyboards, vocals
Martha Ladly – keyboards, trombone, vocals
Mark Gane – synthesizer, guitar
Carl Finkle – bass
Tim Gane – drums
Andy Haas – saxophone

Chart performance

Album

Singles

References

1979 debut albums
Martha and the Muffins albums
Albums produced by Mike Howlett